The five-spotted wrasse (Symphodus roissali) is a species of wrasse native to the eastern Atlantic Ocean from the Bay of Biscay to Morocco and through the coastal waters of the Mediterranean Sea and the Black Sea. This species is sought by local peoples as a food fish and can also be found in the aquarium trade.

References 

five-spotted wrasse
Fish of the Black Sea
five-spotted wrasse